Safa Riz (also Romanized as Şafā Rīz; also known as Sag-i-Rīz) is a village in Shirin Su Rural District, Shirin Su District, Kabudarahang County, Hamadan Province, Iran. At the 2006 census, its population was 500, in 106 families.

References 

Populated places in Kabudarahang County